Rodney Eric Terry (born March 27, 1968) is an American college basketball coach who is the interim head coach at Texas.

Early life and education
Born in Angleton, Texas, Terry graduated from Angleton High School and played college basketball at St. Edward's University in Austin. Terry graduated from St. Edward's in 1990 with a bachelor's degree in business administration with a minor in physical education.

Coaching career
Terry began his coaching career as an assistant coach at St. Edward's in the 1990–91 season. Then, Terry became an assistant at James Bowie High School also in Austin, where he would remain from 1991 to 1993.

After his stint at Bowie, Terry became a head coach for the first time at Somerville High School in Somerville, Texas. In his two seasons at Somerville (1993 to 1995), Terry went 49–21 and led Somerville to the Class 2A semifinals in 1994. Terry returned to Angleton High School to be head coach in the 1995–96 season, during which he had a 15–13 record for a cumulative 64–34 high school coaching record.

In 1996, Terry moved up to the major college level as an assistant at Baylor under Harry Miller. After two years at Baylor, Terry joined the staff of Jerry Wainwright as assistant coach at UNCW. During a stint that lasted from 1998 to 2002, Terry helped UNCW make the 2000 and 2002 NCAA Tournaments by way of winning the CAA Tournaments. As a #13 seed in 2002, UNCW upset #4 seed USC in the first round for the first NCAA Tournament win in program history.

On June 11, 2002, Terry joined Texas as an assistant coach under Rick Barnes. At Texas, Terry helped recruit McDonald's All-American players like Kevin Durant, D. J. Augustin, and Tristan Thompson. Texas also made NCAA Tournament runs to the Final Four in 2003 and to the Elite Eight in 2006 and 2008.

Terry replaced Steve Cleveland as head coach at Fresno State on April 7, 2011. Fresno State went 13–20 (3–11 Western Athletic Conference) in Terry's first season in 2011–12. The following season in 2012–13, Fresno State moved to the Mountain West Conference (MW) and went 11–19.

Fresno State went 21–18 and made the College Basketball Invitational (CBI) in 2013–14 for the program's first 20-win season and postseason appearance since the 2006–07 season. Despite a 1–7 start, Fresno State finished 9–9 in MW play, an unprecedented finish in conference history. Fresno State lost the CBI in three games to Siena. In June 2014, Fresno State extended Terry's contract through 2017.

Despite a 15–17 record in 2014–15, Fresno State improved to 10–8 in MW play and beat four teams that made that year's NCAA tournament: Boise State, San Diego State, UC Irvine, and Wyoming. On January 3, 2015, Fresno State beat #25 San Diego State for its first win over a ranked opponent since 2002.

Terry led Fresno State to a 25–10 record, MW tournament title, and NCAA tournament auto-bid in the 2015–16 season. A #14 seed, Fresno State lost to #3 seed Utah in the first round 80-69. Following a three-year extension and nearly $50,000 annual raise in January 2016, Fresno State extended Terry through the 2020–21 season in December 2016.

On March 12, 2018, Terry was named the new head coach of the University of Texas at El Paso men's basketball team. Terry suffered an attack of anaphylactic shock and was hospitalized in late December 2019. He missed a game against Florida International on January 2, 2020, with assistant coach Kenton Paulino taking over for Terry. Terry was expected to make a full recovery. After starting 8-1 to open the 2019–20 season, Terry and the Miners lost 14 out of their last 23 games.

On April 6, it was reported Terry would leave UTEP to return to Texas as an assistant under newly hired Chris Beard.

Terry was named interim head coach for the Longhorns following Beard’s arrest for domestic violence on December 12, 2022. He would lead the team through the remainder of the season, guiding Texas to their second-ever Big 12 tournament title.

Head coaching record

References

1968 births
Living people
20th-century African-American sportspeople
21st-century African-American sportspeople
African-American basketball coaches
African-American basketball players
American men's basketball coaches
American men's basketball players
Basketball coaches from Texas
Basketball players from Texas
Baylor Bears men's basketball coaches
College men's basketball head coaches in the United States
Fresno State Bulldogs men's basketball coaches
High school basketball coaches in the United States
People from Angleton, Texas
Point guards
Sportspeople from the Houston metropolitan area
St. Edward's Hilltoppers men's basketball players
Texas Longhorns men's basketball coaches
UNC Wilmington Seahawks men's basketball coaches
UTEP Miners men's basketball coaches